Liechtenstein competed at the 2019 European Games in Minsk from 21 to 30 June 2019. Liechtenstein was represented by 1 athlete.

Competitors

Judo

Men

References 

Nations at the 2019 European Games
European Games
2019